is railway station on the Kyūdai Main Line operated by JR Kyushu in Kurume, Fukuoka Prefecture, Japan.

Lines 
Only local trains on the line stop at the station.

Layout 
The station consists of two side platforms serving two tracks at grade. The station building is of modern design and the station facilities are co-located with a local tourism organisation. The station building is unstaffed and serves only to house a waiting area. Access to the opposite side platform is by means of a level crossing.

History
Chikugo-Kusano was opened on the same day as one of several intermediate stations on the track. With the privatization of Japanese National Railways (JNR), the successor of JGR, on 1 April 1987, JR Kyushu took over control of the station.

Passenger statistics
In fiscal 2015, there were 44,000 boarding passengers (in rounded thousands), giving a daily average of 121 passengers.

References

External links
Chikugo-Kusano (JR Kyushu)

Railway stations in Fukuoka Prefecture
Railway stations in Japan opened in 1928